Walter Henry Napier (born 1875, date of death unknown) was an English professional footballer who played as a goalkeeper. He signed for Football League First Division side Burnley in May 1895. He played his only senior match for the club on 2 September 1895 in the 1–5 defeat away at West Bromwich Albion and left the club shortly afterwards.

References

1875 births
Year of death missing
Footballers from Wigan
English footballers
Association football goalkeepers
Burnley F.C. players
English Football League players